Lee Cameron McDonald (February 22, 1925December 29, 2021) was an American political scientist. He taught at Pomona College in Claremont, California from 1952 to 1990, and was the dean of the college from 1970 to 1975. He authored the textbook Western Political Theory. He and his wife, Claire, were married for 75 years and raised five children.

References

1925 births
2021 deaths
Pomona College faculty
Pomona College alumni
University of California, Los Angeles alumni
Harvard University alumni
American political scientists
20th-century American educators
People from Claremont, California
American university and college faculty deans